The George Wallace Memorial Logie for Best New Talent was an award presented annually at the Australian TV Week Logie Awards. The award recognised a new talent in an Australian program.

It was first awarded at the 11th Annual TV Week Logie Awards, held in 1969, the year after the death of Logie Award-winning George Wallace Jnr.

Winners

See also
Graham Kennedy Award for Most Outstanding Newcomer
Logie Award for Most Popular New Male Talent
Logie Award for Most Popular New Female Talent
Logie Award for Most Popular New Talent

References

Awards established in 1969